Sophie Lienard (active 1837–1845) was a French portrait artist who specialized in miniatures. She worked and lived in Paris. Between 1842 and 1845, she exhibited at the Salon in Paris.

During her lifetime, she painted portraits of Queen Victoria, Jérôme Bonaparte and Louis Philippe I.

Notable collections

Noble con abrigo negro (Noble with a black coat), ca. 1845, Museum of Romanticism, Madrid

Gallery

References

Year of birth missing
1845 deaths
19th-century French painters
French women painters
Painters from Paris
Portrait miniaturists
19th-century French women artists